The Trieste Film Festival is an international film festival founded in 1989. Held annually on the third week of January in Trieste, it has become the leading festival of Central and Eastern Europe cinema in Italy.

References

External links
Official site 
Trieste Film Festival at the Internet Movie Database

Film festivals in Italy
Annual events in Italy
1989 establishments in Italy
January events
Culture in Trieste
Film festivals established in 1989
Winter events in Italy